The Other Side of The Street or O outro lado da rua (the original title in Portuguese) is a 2004 Brazilian film written and directed by Marcos Bernstein. It stars Fernanda Montenegro and Raul Cortez.

Plot 
Regina, a lonely and retired grandmother, defies social expectations maintaining a very active lifestyle in Rio de Janeiro's urban life. She does this largely by supplying the police with tips on criminal activities in the area. When she witnesses what she believes is a murder across the street, she tries to obtain incriminating statements from the supposed perpetrator but in the process her whole world changes...

Cast 
Fernanda Montenegro...	Regina Bragança
Raul Cortez...	Dr. Camargo
Luiz Carlos Persy	Detetive Alcides
Laura Cardoso...	Catarina / Patolina
Caio Ramos...	Bruno Bragança
Miguel Lunardi...	Eduardo Bragança
Márcio Vito...	Detetive Walmir
Eliana César...	Isabel Camargo
Milene Pizarro...	Célia Camargo
Flávio Pardal...	Chapeiro in the coffee shop
Mauro José...	Doorman of Regina's building
Fábio Lago...	Doorman of Camargo's building
Déo Garcez...	Salesman

Accolades
2004: Berlin International Film Festival
C.I.C.A.E. Award (won)

2004: Mar del Plata Film Festival
Best Film (Nominee)
Best Ibero-American Film (won)

2004: Tribeca Film Festival
Best Narrative Feature (Nominee)
Best Actress in a Narrative Feature (Fernanda Montenegro) (won)

2005: Cinema Brazil Grand Prize
Best Picture (Nominee)
Best Actress (Fernanda Montenegro) (won)
Best Actor (Raul Cortez) (Nominee)
Best Supporting Actress (Laura Cardoso) (won)
Best Screenplay, Original (Marcos Bernstein and Melanie Dimantas) (Nominee)
Best Sound (Jorge Saldanha, Waldir Xavier and Rodrigo de Noronha) (Nominee)

2005: Santa Barbara International Film Festival
Nueva Vision Award (Marcos Bernstein) (won)

See also
Rear Window (1954 Alfred Hitchcock film)

References

External links
 IMDb

2004 films
2004 thriller drama films
Brazilian thriller drama films
2000s English-language films